Llangedwyn is a village in Montgomeryshire, Powys, Wales. The population of the community at the 2011 census was 402. The community includes the hamlet of Pen-y-bont Llanerch Emrys.

It lies in the Tanat Valley near to the Wales/England border. It is approximately five miles from the small town of Llanfyllin and ten miles from the Shropshire market town of Oswestry. The Berwyn mountain range is nearby, as is Pistyll Rhaeadr waterfall. The ruins of Owain Glyndŵr's Sycharth castle lie a few miles outside the village towards Llansilin.

Sir Watkin Williams-Wynn, 10th Baronet, heir of Owain Gwynedd, lived his final years at Llangedwyn Hall. The hall is a Grade II listed building and its gardens and park are listed at Grade II* on the Cadw/ICOMOS Register of Parks and Gardens of Special Historic Interest in Wales.

Landmarks
The church of Saint Cedwyn and the Llangedywn Church In Wales Primary School is located in the village.

It did have a railway station- Llangedwyn Halt railway station.

Listed buildings
The following are the listed buildings in the vicinity. The listings are all Grade II designated except Henblas and Plas-uchaf:

Bontglantanat Farmhouse and Barn (II)
Brynffynnon (II)
Church of St Cedwyn
Cowhouse Range at Sycharth
Detached Agricultural Range to the south of Bontglantanat Farmhouse
Fila Rhosyn
Gatepiers and Gates at Llangedwyn Hall
Glantanat Isaf
Glantanat Uchaf
Golfa Isaf
Henblas
Hendre
Hendy
Llangedwyn Hall
Lofted Outbuilding at Llangedwyn Hall
Lofted Shed Range at Llangedwyn Hall
Milestone at Abercynllaith
Milestone at Coed-y-wern-ddu
Milestone near Green Inn
Milestone opposite Llangedwyn School
North Stables Range with Cottages at Llangedwyn Hall
Octagonal Stallion Stable near Llangedwyn Hall
Outbuildings north of Green Inn
Plas-uchaf
Pont Glantanat Uchaf
Pont Llanerch Emrys 
Pont Llangedwyn
Priddbwll-bach (old house)
Rear Building at Green Inn
Rose Cottage
Shed, Bullhouse and Pigsties at Sycharth
Stable Block at Llangedwyn Hall
Sycharth
The Green Inn
Walls to Formal Gardens of Llangedwyn Hall
Williams-Wynn Monument in St Cedwyn's Churchyard

Notes

External links 

Llangedwyn Community Council website
GENUKI page

Villages in Powys
Registered historic parks and gardens in Powys